Josef Spale (13 August 1920 – 18 February 1975) was an Austrian footballer. He played in four matches for the Austria national football team in 1946.

References

External links
 

1920 births
1975 deaths
Austrian footballers
Austria international footballers
Place of birth missing
Association footballers not categorized by position